Jeffrey Jermaine Thompkins (born September 14, 1972), known by his stage name JT Money, is an American rapper and the leader of Miami-based hip hop group Poison Clan. Thompkins began his career in the late 1980s as a protégé of Luther "Luke" Campbell  signing to Luke Records in 1990. His debut solo album Pimpin' on Wax was released in 1999 and spawned the successful single "Who Dat", which peaked at number 5 on the Billboard Hot 100.

Music career
Thompkins was discovered by Luke Skyywalker of the 2 Live Crew in a Miami talent show. Skyywalker signed JT Money and Debonaire as the group Poison Clan to his Luke Records. In 1990 JT Money and Debonaire released their first album as a group, 2 Low Life Muthas.  After this Debonaire left Poison Clan to join another group, Home Team, with his brother, Drugzie also from the Poison Clan.  This left JT Money as the main lyrical driving force of the group, which also featured members Madball, Uzi, Big Ram, and associates Shorty-T and Trigga.

The second Poison Clan album, 1992's Poisonous Mentality, featured the hit "Shake What Ya Mama Gave Ya", which was listed by XXL magazine as one of the top 250 hip-hop songs of the 1990s.  JT Money released two more albums under the Poison Clan name: Ruff Town Behavior in 1993 and Straight Zooism in 1995.  Some other well known Poison Clan songs include "Action", "Bad Influence", "Dance All Night", "Fire Up This Funk", "The Girl That I Hate", and "Don't Sleep On A Hizzo".

In 1999 JT Money dropped the Poison Clan name for the album Pimpin' On Wax, now just recording under his own stage name. This album achieved mainstream commercial success with the major hit single "Who Dat", featuring Solé. The song reached number 5 on the Billboard Hot 100 and won Top Rap Single at the 1999 Billboard Music Awards.  After this JT Money continued his solo career, releasing three more albums to date, none of which matched the commercial success of his solo debut.

Albums
Solo Albums:

 
With the Poison Clan:
1990: 2 Low Life Muthas
1992: Poisonous Mentality
1993: Ruff Town Behavior
1995: Strait Zooism

Singles

Featured singles

Music videos

References

Rappers from Miami
Living people
21st-century American rappers
1972 births